Uncle Mo (foaled March 10, 2008, in Kentucky) is an American champion Thoroughbred racehorse who went undefeated in his two-year-old season and was named the American Champion Two-Year-Old of 2010. However, his three-year-old season was disrupted by illness, causing him to miss the Kentucky Derby. Retired to stud in 2012, he was the leading freshman sire with his first foal crop, which included 2016 Kentucky Derby winner Nyquist.

Racing career

2010: two-year-old season
In his first start, a maiden special weight on the Travers undercard at Saratoga, Uncle Mo led at every call to beat a field of 2-year-olds by 14 1/4 lengths. In his next start, the Grade I Champagne Stakes, he took the lead early and never looked back en route to a 5-length win in the time of 1:34 2/5 seconds—faster than Secretariat's 1972 Champagne win.

In the Grade I Breeders' Cup Juvenile, Uncle Mo won by four lengths over Grade 1 winner Boys at Tosconova. He was voted the 2010 Eclipse Award as the American Champion Two-Year-Old Colt.

2011: three-year-old season
As the early favorite for the 2011 Kentucky Derby, the first leg of the U.S. Triple Crown series, Uncle Mo made his 3-year-old debut in the Timely Writer, a one-turn mile overnight stakes at Gulfstream Park. After dawdling on the lead for the first three-quarters of a mile, he came home in 22 4/5 for the final quarter.

His next start was the Wood Memorial Stakes at Aqueduct on April 9. Running 9 furlongs for the first time in his career, Uncle Mo was defeated by Toby's Corner and finished third.

After his upset at 1-10 odds, he was diagnosed with a gastrointestinal infection but was still sent to Churchill Downs in anticipation of a start in the Kentucky Derby. After finishing a course of antibiotics, regressing immediately after stopping medication, and losing over 70 pounds in the weeks before the Derby, he was scratched the day before the race.

Sent to Winstar Farm to recuperate and receive attention from top veterinarians, Uncle Mo was diagnosed with cholangiohepatitis, a rare liver disease. He began treatment while continuing to rest at Winstar. After gaining back 110 pounds in two months, he returned to trainer Todd Pletcher's barn at Saratoga on July 11, 2011. He resumed training and finished second to Caleb's Posse in the 7-furlong King's Bishop Stakes on August 1, 2011.

Retirement
Uncle Mo was retired from racing on November 10, 2011, shortly after finishing 10th in the Breeders' Cup Classic. His retirement was prompted due to elevated levels of the liver enzyme GGT, which also occurred earlier in the season and led to a diagnosis of cholangiohepatitis.

Stud record

Uncle Mo began standing at Ashford Stud, the American arm of Irish breeding giant Coolmore, for the 2012 Thoroughbred breeding season, and is now a "shuttle stallion" servicing mares at Coolmore's American and Australian farms.

Uncle Mo was the leading freshman sire of 2015 in North America and the overall leading sire of two-year-olds in Europe and North America. In 2016, he was not only the leading second-crop sire, he also finished third in the general sire listing despite having only two crops of racing age. His stud fee was increased to $150,000 for the 2017 season.

Notable progeny

Uncle Mo has sired 11 individual Grade I winners.

c = colt, f = filly, g = gelding''

Race Record

Pedigree

References

 Uncle Mo's official website
 Uncle Mo's pedigree and racing stats

2008 racehorse births
Racehorses bred in Kentucky
Racehorses trained in the United States
Eclipse Award winners
Breeders' Cup Juvenile winners
Thoroughbred family 8-c